Samuel Lawrence File (May 18, 1922 – September 25, 2008) was a shortstop in Major League Baseball. He played for the Philadelphia Phillies in 1940.

References

External links

1922 births
2008 deaths
Major League Baseball shortstops
Philadelphia Phillies players
Baseball players from Pennsylvania